Signs Live! (stylized as Signs LIVE!) is an album by jazz guitarist Peter Bernstein.

Background
The quartet of guitarist Peter Bernstein, pianist Brad Mehldau, bassist Christian McBride, and drummer Gregory Hutchinson had recorded together in 1994, resulting in the album Signs of Life.

Music and recording
Signs Live! was recorded in 2015. Most of the compositions are by Bernstein.

Reception

The reviewer for The Times concluded that "The results are, as you may expect, quite special." The DownBeat reviewer wrote: "Bernstein is a guitarist so good he often sounds like two guitarists in a duet. It reflects a mastery that is elegant, mellow and gently swinging, but not especially surprising."

Track listing

Disc One
"Blues for Bulgaria"
"Hidden Pockets"
"Dragonfly"
"Jive Coffee"
"Pannonica"

Disc Two
"Useless Metaphor"
"Let Loose"
"All Too Real"
"Resplendor"
"Crepuscule with Nellie"/"We See"
"Cupcake"

Personnel
 Peter Bernstein – guitar
 Brad Mehldau – piano
 Christian McBride – bass
 Gregory Hutchinson – drums

References

Peter Bernstein albums
Smoke Sessions Records live albums
2015 live albums